Dolagovinda Shiva temple, also known as Vaidyanatha Shiva temple, is at the Rathagada Chowk, Old Town of Bhubaneswar. The presiding deity is Shiva lingam in a circular yonipitha installed inside the sanctum. This 15th-16th-century edifice is a living temple. Laxmidhara Praharaja is the chief priest. It is known as Dolagovinda Shiva on account of its proximity to the DolaMandapa across the road.

Locals ascribe the temple to the Kesharis who were otherwise known as Somavamsis. But the scheme of architecture does not conform to the Somavamsis. Rituals like Chatturdasi, Shivaratri and Kartika Purnima are performed.

References
Book: Lesser Known Monuments of Bhubaneswar by Dr. Sadasiba Pradhan

Hindu temples in Bhubaneswar
Shiva temples in Odisha